Đàng Trong (lit. "Inner Circuit"), also known as Nam Hà ("South of the River"), was the South region of Vietnam, under the rule of the Nguyễn lords, later enlarged by the Vietnamese southward expansion. The word Đàng Trong first appeared in the Dictionarium Annamiticum Lusitanum et Latinum by Alexandre de Rhodes. Contemporary European sources called it Cochinchina or Quinam.

During the 17th century and almost all the 18th century, Đàng Trong was a de facto independent kingdom ruled by the Nguyễn lords while they claimed to be loyal subjects of the Lê emperors in Thăng Long (Hanoi). It was bordered by Đàng Ngoài along the Linh River (modern Gianh River in Quảng Bình Province). Nguyễn rulers titled themselves as Chúa ("Lord") instead of Vua or King until Lord Nguyễn Phúc Khoát officially claimed the title Vũ Vương ("Martial King") in 1744. The country did not have an official name, foreigners often called it the kingdom of Quảng Nam (Chữ Quốc ngữ: Quảng Nam Quốc), after the Quảng Nam Governorate where the important harbor Hội An (Faifo) located.

See also

Đàng Ngoài
Southern Vietnam 
Trịnh–Nguyễn War

Notes

References

History of Vietnam